Pieter Jansz Post (1 May 1608 – buried 8 May 1669) was a Dutch Golden Age architect, painter and printmaker.

Biography
Post was baptised in Haarlem, the son of a stained-glass painter and the older brother of painter Frans Post. He is credited with the creation of the Dutch baroque style of architecture, along with his longtime collaborator Jacob van Campen. Together they designed the Mauritshuis in the Hague. According to Houbraken he was a famous architect who introduced his brother Frans to Maurice of Nassau, Prince of Orange while he was working on plans for the Mauritshuis.

According to the RKD he became a member of the Haarlem Guild of St. Luke in 1623, and became painter and architect for Stadhouder Frederik Hendrik. He was the overseer from 1640 for the new additions to Paleis Noordeinde in The Hague. From 1645 he was the architect for Frederik Hendrik for Huis ten Bosch, where he worked together with Jacob van Campen.  He died in The Hague, aged 61.
His son Maurits became an architect, and his son Johan Post became a painter, and his daughter married the anatomist and collector Frederik Ruysch. His granddaughter Rachel Ruysch became a famous flower painter.

(Some) buildings he designed
1642 Huis Dedel, The Hague
1643 Huis Prinsessegracht 4 (the Hague)
1645-1650 Huis ten Bosch (the Hague)
1645-1648 Gemeenlandshuis Zwanenburg, Halfweg
1649-1653 Huis De Onbeschaamde, Dordrecht
1652-1657 Gebouw van de Staten van Holland, (the Hague)
1655 Johan de Witt Huis, (the Hague)
1657-1658 De Waag, Leiden
1659-1685 Stadhuis, Maastricht
1659-1662 Kruithuis, Delft
1660 Hofje van Nieuwkoop (Den Haag),
1661-1662  Torendeel van Lambertuskerk in Buren
1662-1665 Kasteel Heeze, Heeze
1662-1680 Hervormde Kerk, Bennebroek
1663 Kerk van Stompetoren
1668-     Kaaswaag, Gouda

Gallery

References

External links

Pieter Post on Artnet

1608 births
1669 deaths
Dutch Golden Age architects
Dutch Golden Age painters
Dutch male painters
Artists from Haarlem
Painters from Haarlem
Court architects
17th-century Dutch architects